Pablo Bandomo (born 22 June 1952) is a retired Cuban sprinter.

References

1952 births
Living people
Cuban male sprinters
Place of birth missing (living people)
Competitors at the 1974 Central American and Caribbean Games
Central American and Caribbean Games gold medalists for Cuba
Central American and Caribbean Games medalists in athletics
20th-century Cuban people